The Mom and Dads were a Western-styled folk music group from Spokane, Washington that specialized in waltzes, polkas, and general easy listening.  The quartet, made up of one woman and three men, featured Doris A. Crow (June 17, 1905 – September 28, 1998) on piano,  Quentin Ratliff (August 13, 1933 - January 25, 2013) on saxophone, Leslie Welch (February 2, 1912 – February 1, 1983) on accordion, and Harold Hendren (July 12, 1919 - September 9, 2008) on drums.

Band Biography

The band, which formed in the early 1950s, named itself after its main repertoire; "Music for Mom and Dad". .  In the early years of its history, the band was strictly a part-time endeavor with its members holding down more typical jobs during the week.

Their LP album entitled Presenting... The Mom and Dads had a mini biography printed on the back of the album sleeve.  The section claimed that the Mom and Dads were able to play nearly any type of then existing dance music, from turn of the century dance music such as the Three Step, to more modern sounds, such as country and western.

Their biography states that all the band members had individually begun to play dance music between the ages of 12 and 14.  Doris Crow and Leslie Welch had been playing together for over 22 years when the youngest member of the band, Quentin Ratliff joined them.  The group finally became a four-piece 7 years later when Harold Hendren, who had begun his musical career in New Mexico, joined the band on drums.

Most of the band's fame was in Canada and Australia. They first gained notoriety when a disc jockey from a high-powered radio station in Great Falls, Montana played their early recording, "The Rangers Waltz", a song composed by Quentin Ratliff, the group's saxophonist, also carrying into the Canadian province of Alberta. "The Rangers Waltz" was also released as a single in Australia, where it reached #2 on the national charts, and in New Zealand, where it reached #1 for one week in March '72. https://en.m.wikipedia.org/wiki/List_of_number-one_singles_in_1972_(New_Zealand)

"The Ranger's Waltz" marked their peak in 1971, when the title cut off the same-named album climbed into the American Top 10 country music charts, topping out at Number Four and eventually achieving double-platinum sales figures.  The band had first started to appear on music charts earlier that year with the album "In the Blue Canadian Rockies".

The Mom and Dads also began their first international tour, albeit reluctantly, when they went to Australia in the fall of 1974, after another act had cancelled.  They spent four weeks promoting their albums overseas before returning home and resuming performance dates in their native Pacific Northwest.

The Mom and Dads were seen in a string of late-night television commercials in the United States during the mid-1980s.

The group continued to tour and record regularly until Welch's death in 1983.

Discography

Albums

Singles

Releases

Singles
"The Ranger's Waltz" GNP
"Amazing Grace" GNP-Crescendo
"Anniversary Waltz" GNP-Crescendo
"Auld Lang Syne" GNP
"Baby Blue" GNP-Crescendo
"Blue Canadian Rockies" Golden West Melodies
"Blue Skirt Waltz" MCA
"Cab Driver Foxtrot"
"Jingle Bell Rock" (1972) MCA
"Kentucky Waltz" GNP Crescendo
"Love Is a Beautiful Song" MCA
"Mom&Dad's Schottische"
"Moonlight On The Manitoulin" MCA
"My Blue Heaven" GNP-Crescendo
"My Happiness" (1973) GNP-Crescendo
"Quentin's E Flat Boogie" GNP Crescendo
"Ragtime Annie P"
"Rippling River Waltz" (1971) MCA
"Silver Moon"
"Skirts"
"Somewhere My Love"
"St Paul Waltz"
"Wabash Cannonball"
"Waltz Across Texas"
"Waltz you Saved For Me"/"When The Saints Go Marching In"
"Whispering"
"White Silver Sands"
"Your Cheatin' Heart"

Albums
Presenting The Mom and Dads (1971) Apex
Blue Canadian Rockies (1971) MCA
Souvenirs (1972) MCA
The Mom and Dads Again (1972) MCA
Merry Christmas (1973) MCA
Reminiscing with The Mom and Dads (1973) MCA
Love Is a Beautiful Song (1974) MCA
Dance with The Mom and Dads (1974) MCA
(The Mom and Dads) Play Your Favorite Hymns (1974) GRT
In The Good Old Summertime (1976)
Down The River Of Golden Dreams (1976)
Meet The Mom and Dads (1977) GRT
Best Of (1977) GRT
One Dozen Roses (1977) GNP-Crescendo
Whispering Hope (1977) GRT
22 Favorite Country Songs (1977) GNP-Crescendo
Gratefully Yours (1978) Interfusion
20 Favorite Waltzes (1978) GRT
To Mom and Dad With Love (1980) MCA
With Love From The Mom and Dads (1980) Crescendo
Good Night Sweetheart (1982) Crescendo
Thanks For The Memories (1986) Quality
Dream With The Mom and Dads GRT
Love Letters In The Sand Crescendo
Memories (1976) Crescendo
Blue Hawaii MCA
The Very Best Of MCA
18 Cand W Favorites
Collection (5 LP set)
Rangers Waltz

References

 Spokane M&D Unit Heads for Aussieland September 28th - Billboard magazine - August 24, 1974
 The Mom & Dads - The Spokesman Review - Sunday, February 18, 1979
 Doris Crow obituary - The Spokesman Review - October 2, 1998
 Quentin Ratliff obituary - Legacy.com
 Social Security Death Index

American folk musical groups
Musical groups from Washington (state)
Musical groups disestablished in 1983